Mineral Wells is a city in Palo Pinto and Parker Counties in the U.S. state of Texas. The population was 14,820 at the 2020 census. The city is named for mineral wells in the area, which were highly popular in the early 1900s.

History

In 1919, Mineral Wells hosted the spring training camp for the Chicago White Sox, the year of the famous "Black Sox" scandal involving "Shoeless" Joe Jackson. Mineral Wells also hosted spring training for the Cincinnati Reds and St. Louis Cardinals in the 1910s and early 1920s. The baseball field was located in the center of town.

In 1952, Mineral Wells was the host of the Republican state convention in which delegates divided between presidential candidates Dwight D. Eisenhower and Senator Robert A. Taft. Though state chairman Orville Bullington of Wichita Falls led the Taft forces, the convention vote ultimately went 33–5 in favor of Eisenhower.

Military History

Mineral Wells military history dates back to 1916 with the organization of Company 1, 4th Texas Infantry. By January 1925, the War Department approved the site that would become Camp Wolters, the training ground for the 56th Cavalry Brigade of the Texas National Guard.

In 1956, the base began operations as the Primary Helicopter Center of the United States Army that would provide basic training and primary flight training for all rotary-wing aviators. The Vietnam War created an increased need for pilots. To meet the demand, Fort Wolters increased operations to become the training site for helicopter pilots for the Marine Corp in 1968 and the Air Force in 1970. Nearly every helicopter pilot that flew in Vietnam was trained at Fort Wolters.

Fort Wolters was deactivated in 1973. The 8,500 acres was then parsed out to the city of Mineral Wells, private businessmen, Weatherford College, and Lake Mineral Wells State Park.

State Park
Mineral Wells is very well known for the state park which features fishing, camping, horse riding, biking, hiking trails and rock climbing. One attraction is Penitentiary Hollow, a popular rock climbing area.

Film
Prison Break Season 2 episode 8 "Dead Fall"  set in "Arizona" is actually various locations in and around Mineral Wells.  In an opening aerial shot showing downtown Hwy 281 Northbound, Crazy Water banners can be seen on the light poles.

Geography

Mineral Wells is located at  (32.808594, –98.101859). Mineral Wells lies east of the Brazos River and Palo Pinto Mountains.

According to the United States Census Bureau, the city has a total area of 21.2 square miles (54.9 km), of which 20.5 square miles (53.0 km) of it are land and 0.7 square miles (1.9 km) of it (3.45%) is covered by water.

Demographics

2020 census

As of the 2020 United States census, there were 14,820 people, 4,958 households, and 3,329 families residing in the city.

2000 census
As of the census of 2000,  16,946 people, 5,707 households, and 3,857 were families residing in the city. The population density was 828.6 people per square mile (319.9/km). The 6,386 housing units averaged 312.2 per square mile (120.6/km). The racial makeup of the city was 77.69% White, 8.77% African American, 0.54% Native American, 0.65% Asian,  10.51% from other races, and 1.84% from two or more races. Hispanics or Latinos of any race were 19.27% of the population.

Of the 5,707 households, 31.7% had children under the age of 18 living with them, 49.5% were married couples living together, 13.1% had a female householder with no husband present, and 32.4% were not families.  About 28.3% of all households were made up of individuals, and 14.4% had someone living alone who was 65 years of age or older. The average household size was 2.56, and the average family size was 3.13.

In the city, the age distribution was 24.1% under 18, 10.1% from 18 to 24, 32.0% from 25 to 44, 19.2% from 45 to 64, and 14.6% who were 65 or older. The median age was 35 years. For every 100 females, there were 120.2 males. For every 100 females age 18 and over, there were 123.3 males.

The median income for a household in the city was $27,233, and for a family was $33,765. Males had a median income of $29,074 versus $18,633 for females. The per capita income for the city was $13,336. About 16.6% of families and 20.7% of the population were below the poverty line, including 28.2% of those under age 18 and 11.9% of those age 65 or over.

Climate
The climate in this area is characterized by relatively high temperatures and evenly distributed precipitation throughout the year.  The Köppen climate classification describes the weather as humid subtropical, and uses the code Cfa.

Government

The Texas Department of Criminal Justice (TDCJ) operates the Mineral Wells District Parole Office in Mineral Wells. The Corrections Corporation of America (CCA) operated the Mineral Wells Pre-Parole Transfer Facility in the Fort Wolters Industrial Park on behalf of the TDCJ. It closed in August 2013. The correctional facility, which had been operated by CCA since 1995, is located on the property of the former Fort Wolters in Palo Pinto County and in Mineral Wells. It can house up to 2,100 prisoners. As of March 2013, its annual payroll was $11.7 million, and it was among the largest employers in Mineral Wells, with about 300 employees. On Monday March 4, 2013, the Texas Senate Senate Finance Committee voted 11-4 to close the correctional facility. Mike Allen, the mayor of Mineral Wells, criticized the closure, saying, "We'll lose right at over 300 jobs, and 300 jobs in a community of 17,000 ... is devastating. This means a lot to this community." John Whitmire, the head of the Texas Senate Criminal Justice Committee, said, "We're sitting on about 12,000 empty [prison] beds, so it just makes good business sense ... that we not operate it, and we take those savings and plow them back into additional public-safety programs."

The United States Postal Service operates the Mineral Wells Post Office.  Zip codes are 76067 and 76068.

Education
Mineral Wells is served by the Mineral Wells Independent School District, and by the Community Christian School.

Weatherford College operates a branch campus on the old Fort Wolters facility.

Notable people
 Barbara H. Bowman, geneticist
 Adrian Colbert, NFL football player for the Miami Dolphins
 Alvin Garrett, NFL football player and Super Bowl champion
 Dan Herbeck, journalist for The Buffalo News; co-author of American Terrorist, best-seller biography of Oklahoma City bomber Timothy McVeigh
 Millie Hughes-Fulford, American medical investigator, molecular biologist and former NASA astronaut who flew aboard a NASA Space Shuttle mission as a Payload Specialist
 Shane McAnally, singer-songwriter and record producer
 Alvy Ray Smith (born 8 September 1943), noted pioneer in computer graphics and the cofounder of Pixar
 Amanda Shires, singer songwriter
 James Vick, UFC lightweight

Gallery

References

External links
 City of Mineral Wells
 Mineral Wells Chamber of Commerce
 Historic Mineral Wells materials
 Mineral Wells City Directories, 1909 and 1920
 A Pictorial History of Fort Wolters
 Historic Mineral Wells postcards and photographs 
 Mineral Wells Guide
 Mineral Wells Fossil Park, Palo Pinto County, Texas.
 Mineral Wells Fossil Park, Palo Pinto County, Texas, Dec. 22, 2005.

Cities in Palo Pinto County, Texas
Cities in Parker County, Texas
Cities in Texas
Dallas–Fort Worth metroplex
Micropolitan areas of Texas